Osmar Daniel Malevo Ferreyra (born 9 January 1983) is an Argentine former professional footballer who played as a midfielder.

Club career
Ferreyra started his career with River Plate. He was signed by PFC CSKA Moscow in January 2004 and was part of the team that won the 2004–05 UEFA Cup, being on the bench for the final. In June 2005, he joined PSV Eindhoven on loan, but he returned to CSKA in December 2005. In 2006, he joined San Lorenzo, where he helped the team to win the 2007 Clausura.

In January 2008, he moved to Dnipro Dnipropetrovsk.

In July 2011, he signed a three-year deal with Independiente, back in his native country.

On 2 July 2013, Ferreyra was confirmed as a new River Plate player, club where he made his debut under the same coach who called him again, Ramón Díaz. He signed for two years.

In March 2015, he joined Atlético Rafaela on loan for six months.

In January 2016, he signed an 18-month contract with Panetolikos F.C. On 24 December 2016, Panetolikos and Ferreyra parted ways.

International career
Ferreyra was capped for the Argentina Under-20 team during the 2003 FIFA World Youth Championship. He also played for the Argentina U-23 team.

Honours

Club
CSKA Moscow
Russian Premier League: 2005
UEFA Cup: 2005

PSV Eindhoven
Eredivisie: 2004–05

San Lorenzo
Argentine Primera División: 2007 Clausura

River Plate
Argentine Primera División: Torneo Final 2014
Copa Sudamericana: 2014

International
Argentina
Pan American Games: 2003

References

External links
 
 

Association football midfielders
People from Uruguay Department
1983 births
Living people
Argentine footballers
Argentina under-20 international footballers
Argentine expatriate footballers
Pan American Games gold medalists for Argentina
Expatriate footballers in Russia
Expatriate footballers in the Netherlands
Expatriate footballers in Ukraine
Expatriate footballers in Greece
Club Atlético River Plate footballers
PFC CSKA Moscow players
PSV Eindhoven players
San Lorenzo de Almagro footballers
FC Dnipro players
Club Atlético Independiente footballers
Atlético de Rafaela footballers
Panetolikos F.C. players
Eredivisie players
Russian Premier League players
Argentine Primera División players
Ukrainian Premier League players
Super League Greece players
Argentine expatriate sportspeople in Russia
Argentine expatriate sportspeople in the Netherlands
Argentine expatriate sportspeople in Ukraine
Pan American Games medalists in football
Footballers at the 2003 Pan American Games
Medalists at the 2003 Pan American Games
Sportspeople from Entre Ríos Province